"Heartbeat" is a song by Nigerian singer Nneka. It was released in 2008 as a single from her second studio album No Longer at Ease, as well as her third studio album Concrete Jungle. A 2010 EP release of the song features American rapper Nas. The song was remixed by English electronic music duo Chase & Status and included on the "new edition" of their debut studio album, More than Alot. The remix of the song was sampled in Rita Ora's 2012 song "R.I.P.".

Background 
The original release of the song was written by Nneka Egbuna (Nneka) and produced by DJ Farhot, and released as a single in 2008. A music video was released to promote the single. An EP for the song was released on 5 October 2010, featuring American rapper Nas.

The song charted on release in Portugal, Germany, and Austria. In 2009, the song charted in the UK Singles Chart at position 20. The song has also charted in France and the Netherlands.

Track listing

Charts

References 

2008 songs
2008 singles